The National Association of Realtors (NAR) is an American trade association for those who work in the real estate industry. It has over 1.4 million members, making it one of the biggest trade associations in the USA including NAR's institutes, societies, and councils, involved in all aspects of the residential and commercial real estate industries. The organization holds a U.S. trademark over the term "realtor", limiting the use of the term to its members. NAR also functions as a self-regulatory organization for real estate brokerage. The organization is headquartered in Chicago.

Overview

The National Association of Realtors was founded on May 12, 1908 as the National Association of Real Estate Exchanges in Chicago, Illinois.  In 1916, the National Association of Real Estate Exchanges changed its name to The National Association of Real Estate Boards.  The current name was adopted in 1972.

NAR's members are residential and commercial real estate brokers, real estate salespeople, immovable property managers, appraisers, counselors, and others engaged in all aspects of the real estate (immovable property) industry, where a state license to practice is required. Members belong to one or more of some 1,600 local realtor boards or associations. They are pledged to a code of ethics and standards of practice, which were adopted in 1913.

The National Association of Realtors is also a member of The Real Estate Roundtable, a lobbying group in Washington, D.C.

Trademark 
The NAR holds a U.S. trademark over the term "realtor" and several related terms. The organization's style guide states that "the preferred form of the term is REALTOR—in all caps, and using the registered trademark symbol".

The use of the term "realtor" was first proposed by Charles N. Chadbourn, in an article in the National Real Estate Journal in March 1916. Chadbourn, then a real estate agent in Minneapolis and vice-president of the National Association of Real Estate Boards, wrote "I propose that the National Association adopt a professional title to be conferred upon its members which they shall use to distinguish them from outsiders. That this title be copyrighted and defended by the National Association against misuse... I therefore, propose that the National Association adopt and confer upon its members, dealers in realty, the title of realtor (accented on the first syllable)."  The association adopted the term the following year, at its national convention in New Orleans in April 1916.

In 1949, the National Association of Real Estate Boards obtained U.S. registration no. 515,200 for "realtors" as a collective trademark for real estate brokerage services.  In 1950, it obtained a second registration, registration no. 519,789, for "realtor", in the same field. 
NAR has since obtained registrations for the term in such fields as electronic lock-boxes, clothing, and jewelry.

The 515,200 and 519,789 registrations have been subject to a number of cancellation proceedings:

In June 1998, Arleen Freeman, a real estate agent who had formerly been an NAR member, petitioned the U.S. Patent and Trademark Office (USPTO) to cancel both registrations.  In June 2002, the USPTO's Trademark Trial and Appeal Board (TTAB) held that, because Freeman was a former member of NAR and a licensee of the trademarks, she was estopped from bringing a proceeding to cancel them under the doctrine of licensee estoppel.
In November 2001, Jacob Zimmerman, a student who was not a member of NAR, petitioned the USPTO to cancel the registrations, on the ground that "realtor" and "realtors" were generic terms rather than a trademark.  On March 31, 2004, the TTAB denied the petition, finding on the evidence before it that the term was not generic.
In March 2015, Jeffrey Schermerhorn petitioned to cancel the 519,789 registration.   Schermerhorn alleged fraud under Torres v. Cantine Torresella S.r.l. as well as genericness, arguing that "Social Media such as Facebook, Twitter, LinkedIn, Instagram and Google Plus" provides additional evidence of generic use that was not available at the time of the Zimmerman proceeding.  On March 30, 2016, the TTAB granted the NAR's motion to dismiss the petition on the ground that Schermerhorn, who had been a NAR member and licensee at the time he submitted his petition to cancel, was also estopped from challenging the mark.

NAR and Multiple Listing Service (MLS) systems
The NAR governs the hundreds of local Multiple Listing Services (MLSs) which are the information exchanges used across the nation by real estate brokers. (However, there are many MLSs that are independent of NAR, although membership is typically limited to licensed brokers and their agents; MLSPIN is an example of one of the larger independent MLSs in North America.)

Through a complicated arrangement, NAR sets the policies for most of the Multiple Listings Services, and in the late 1990s, with the growth of the Internet, NAR evolved regulations allowing Internet Data Exchanges (IDX) whereby brokers would allow a portion of their data to be seen on the Internet via brokers' or agents' websites and Virtual Office Websites (VOW) which required potential buyers to register to obtain information.

These policies allowed participants—whether they were individual one-person brokers or large regional companies—to limit access to some or all of the MLS data by individual brokers (whether they were brokers operating solely on the Internet or local competitors). In 2005, this prompted the Department of Justice to file an antitrust lawsuit against NAR alleging its MLS rules in regard to these types of limitations on the display of data were the product of a conspiracy to restrain trade by excluding brokers who used the Internet to operate differently from traditional brick-and-mortar brokers. (For a description of the DOJ action, see Antitrust Case filings for U.S. vs. National Association of Realtors.) Meanwhile, various real estate trends such as expanded consumer access and the Internet are consolidating existing local MLS organizations into larger and more statewide or regional MLS systems, such as in California and Virginia/Maryland/Washington, D.C.'s Metropolitan Regional Information Systems.

In response to the case, NAR had proposed setting up a single Internet Listing Display system which would not allow participants to exclude individual brokers (whether of a bricks-and-mortar type or solely internet-based) but require a blanket opting out of display on all other brokers sites. This system became the IDX system. Although IDX allows the public to view MLS listings, it still requires the listing brokerage information to be placed on the listing every place it appears (brokers legally "own" the listings of their brokerage), to prevent misrepresentation of the listing information, and to place accountability for the information on the broker as the law dictates.

The antitrust lawsuit was settled in May 2008. The agreement mandates that all Multiple Listing Service systems allow access to Internet-based competitors. The NAR will be required to treat online brokers the same as traditional brokers and cannot exclude them from membership because they do not have a traditional business model. The NAR admitted no wrongdoing, and it paid neither fines nor damages as part of the deal. The settlement will not be official until a federal judge formally approves it, most likely in 2008. While the general counsel of the NAR believes that the settlement will have no effect on the commission paid by the general public, a business professor at Western Michigan University predicted that the increased competition would cause a 25 to 50 percent decrease in commissions.

Another major anticompetitive practice is supported (indirectly) by various state laws which prohibit the "sharing" of commissions with unlicensed individuals. In broad interpretations, this is deemed to prevent a buyers' agent from providing a credit to his or her buyers from commissions received. Currently, there are 10 states where real estate agents and brokers are barred from offering homebuyers or sellers cash rebates or gifts of any kind with a cash value more than $25. Various realtors in such states have successfully contested this interpretation in states which now allow the practice (notably, Patrick Lea, a realtor in Ohio, and numerous agents in Kentucky). The Kentucky case was ultimately tried with the United States Department of Justice as the plaintiff and the Kentucky Real Estate Commission as the defendant.

In 2019, The National Association of Realtors’ board approved the Clear Cooperation Policy. A policy that requires brokers to submit a listing to the Multiple Listings Service within one business day of marketing a property to the public.

Lobbying
The NAR wields substantial power as a lobbying organization.  Since 1999, the NAR has spent more than $99,384,108, and spent $22,355,463 in 2011 alone. It has consistently ranked among the largest Political Action Committees in the United States.

In its 2016 figures, OpenSecrets ranked the National Association of Realtors as the 2nd largest top spender in lobbying after the U.S. Chamber of Commerce. The NAR spent $64,821,111 in 2016. 

On the total spending, the largest share—46%—has gone to Republicans, and 30.8% has gone to Democrats. Key political issues for the group revolve around federal de-regulation of the financial services industry.

Enabling the subprime mortgage crisis

Some experts believe that brokers and realtors bear at least partial responsibility for the subprime mortgage crisis, purposefully inflating the perceived market values of homes, and subsequently encouraging buyers to take out larger mortgages than needed.  The theory is that collusion with mortgage lenders enabled realtors to earn high volumes of commission on borrowed money for inflated house values with no risk to the realtors.  Many victims feel that home buyers were tricked into taking out larger loans to buy more expensive homes, and the higher sales prices paid the realtors higher commissions. This practice is not considered "unethical" by the NAR which claims to be a Self-regulatory organization; however, obvious implications show extensive and substantial harm rendered to the public.  Many victims are encouraging the Securities and Exchange Commission to begin aggressively regulating agents and refunding overpayments to homebuyers.

Antitrust lawsuits
In 2005, the United States Department of Justice filed a formal complaint against the National Association of Realtors for violating Section 4 of the Sherman Antitrust Act. The complaint sought to enjoin the National Association of Realtors "from maintaining or enforcing a policy that restrains competition from brokers who use the Internet to more efficiently and cost effectively serve home sellers and buyers, and from adopting other related anticompetitive rules.

The DOJ challenged NAR's MLS rules that inhibited competition from Internet-based brokers. On November 18, 2008 the Court entered a Final Judgment approving a settlement against NAR.
Under the Final Judgment, the NAR agreed to the policies challenged by the United States and replaced those policies with rules that do not discriminate against brokers who use the Internet to provide low-priced brokerage services to consumers.

In 2012, American Home Realty Network, Inc. the operator of NeighborCity filed antitrust counterclaims in response to a pair of copyright lawsuits, alleging that the "copyright lawsuits filed against it by two multiple listing services with financial backing from the National Association of Realtors are part of a concerted effort by NAR to drive the company out of business and eliminate it as a provider of services to real estate brokers." The counter-claims also allege that the copyrights asserted were never properly registered. In the Minnesota case, which recites claims against the NAR but does not directly name the NAR as a counter-defendant, AHRN filed a second amended counterclaim adding Edina Realty and Home Services of America as Counter-Defendants in the antitrust and unfair competition claims. Edina Realty is a subsidiary of HomeServices of America, Inc., a Berkshire Hathaway company, which owns real estate brokerage firms in states across the country, including Minnesota, Maryland, North Carolina, Georgia, Washington, Oregon, Arizona, Rhode Island, Connecticut, Iowa, Nebraska, Ohio, Illinois, Kansas, South Carolina, Missouri, Pennsylvania, Indiana, Kentucky, Alabama, and California. Earlier in 2012, the mid-Atlantic multiple listing service Metropolitan Regional Information Systems, Inc. (MRIS) and St. Paul, MN-based Regional Multiple Listing Service of Minnesota Inc. (NorthstarMLS) filed copyright claims against NeighborCity. The National Association of Realtors said it would provide financial support for NorthstarMLS and MRIS legal expenses.

Another lawsuit was filed in March 2019 challenging NAR's compensation policies which require all member brokers demand blanket, non-negotiable buyer-side commission fees when listing a home on a Multiple Listing Service (MLS).

Specializations

NAR educational requirements and recognized designations
Realtors, as members of NAR, also have the option of studying for additional certifications in a variety of specialties, several of which are backed by NAR with offerings of certification and update courses available nationwide.

The most well known NAR sponsored designations are the following:

Accredited Buyer Representative (ABR)
Accredited Land Consultant (ALC)
Certified Commercial Investment Member (CCIM)
Certified Property Manager (CPM)
Certified Real Estate Brokerage Manager (CRB)
Certified Residential Specialist (CRS)
Certification for Internet Professionalism (e-Pro)
Certified International Property Specialist (CIPS)
Counselor of Real Estate (CRE)
Graduate of the Realtor's Institute (GRI)
Real Estate Professional Assistant (REPA)
Seniors Real Estate Specialist (SRES)
Society of Industrial and Office Realtors (SIOR)

Consumer outreach
The NAR launched HouseLogic.com in February 2010 in an attempt to reach consumers directly for the first time. Beyond establishing that bond with consumers, the goal of the site is to provide education—with much commercial interests—to consumers about investing in their homes.

NAR produces the radio show Real Estate Today, which is distributed by Westwood One.

Other national real estate associations
Canadian Association of Accredited Mortgage Professionals
Canadian Real Estate Association
National Association of Estate Agents
National Association of Real Estate Brokers

See also
Real estate broker
Real estate trends
Estate agent
List of real estate topics
United States housing bubble
Housing Affordability Index
Real property

References

External links

Real estate companies established in 1908
Real estate industry trade groups
Organizations based in Washington, D.C.
1908 establishments in the United States
Real estate in the United States
501(c)(6) nonprofit organizations
Lobbying organizations in the United States